Samuel Mugisha (born 5 December 1997) is a Rwandan cyclist, who currently rides for UCI Continental team . He won the Tour of Rwanda in 2018.

In September 2022, Mugisha traveled to the United States for the 2022 Maryland Cycling Classic. However, after arriving at the airport he did not arrive at the hotel and a day later he was not at the start of the race, after which his team reported him missing. Camera footage from the airport showed Mugisha passing through passport control and getting into the car with two people he "clearly knew".

Major results
2015
 8th Time trial, National Junior Road Championships
2016
 1st  Mountains classification, Tour of Rwanda
2017
 3rd Team time trial, African Road Championships
2018
 1st  Overall Tour of Rwanda
1st  Young rider classification
1st Stage 2
 1st Stage 3 Tour de l'Espoir
 1st  Mountains classification, Giro della Valle d'Aosta
2019
 National Road Championships
3rd Time trial
4th Road race
2020
 6th Overall Grand Prix Chantal Biya
1st  Mountains classification
2022
 2nd Time trial, National Road Championships

References

External links
 

1997 births
Living people
Rwandan male cyclists
People from Nyabihu District